Vaive Parish is an administrative unit of Cēsis Municipality in the Vidzeme region of Latvia (prior to 2009 - of Cēsis District).

The population in 2021 was 1,328.

Before 1925, Vaive Parish was called Veismaņi Parish. It was a part of Cēsu apriņķis.

Towns, villages and settlements of Vaive parish 

Ģūģeri
Eicēni
Kaupēni
Krīvi
Lielmaņi
Mežmaļi
Pinderes
Pūtēji
Rāmuļi
Rāmuļu muiža (Rāmuļi Manor)
Vaive
Veismaņi

Parishes of Latvia
Cēsis Municipality
Vidzeme